The Royal Montreal Regiment is a Primary Reserve infantry regiment of the Canadian Army based in Westmount, Quebec. It is part of the 2nd Canadian Division's 34 Canadian Brigade Group.

Lineage

The Royal Montreal Regiment 
Originated 2 November 1914 in Westmount, Quebec as an "8 company regiment of infantry"
Designated 1 December 1914 as the 58th Westmount Rifles
Redesignated 29 March 1920 as The Royal Montreal Regiment
Redesignated 15 December 1936 as The Royal Montreal Regiment (Machine Gun)'
Redesignated 7 November 1940 as the 2nd (Reserve) Battalion, The Royal Montreal Regiment (Machine Gun)
Redesignated 16 October 1945 as The Royal Montreal Regiment (Machine Gun)
Redesignated 1 September 1954 as The Royal Montreal Regiment

Lineage chart

Perpetuations

The Great War
14th Battalion (Royal Montreal Regiment), CEF
23rd Reserve Battalion, CEF

Operational history

The Great War
The 14th Battalion (Royal Montreal Regiment), CEF was authorized on 1 September 1914 and embarked for Great Britain on 27 and 29 September 1914.  It disembarked in France on 15 February 1915, where it fought as part of the 3rd Infantry Brigade, 1st Canadian Division in France and Flanders until the end of the war. The battalion disbanded on 15 September 1920.

The 23rd Reserve Battalion, CEF was authorized on 21 October 1914 as the 23rd Battalion, CEF, and embarked for Great Britain on 23 February 1915 where it was redesignated as the 23rd Reserve Battalion, CEF on 18 April 1915 to provide reinforcements for the Canadian Corps in the field. The battalion disbanded on 15 September 1920.

The Second World War
The regiment mobilized as The Royal Montreal Regiment (Machine Gun), CASF for active service on 1 September 1939. It was redesignated 1st Battalion, The Royal Montreal Regiment (Machine Gun), CASF on 7 November 1940. The regiment converted 
to armour on 25 January 1943 and was redesignated the 32nd Reconnaissance Regiment (Royal Montreal Regiment), CAC, CASF. It was reconverted back to infantry on 12 April 1944 and redesignated as the First Army Headquarters Defence Company (Royal Montreal Regiment), CASF, and on 5 April 1945 as the First Canadian Army Headquarters Defence Battalion (Royal Montreal
Regiment), CASF.

The Royal Montreal Regiment (Machine Gun) embarked for the Great Britain on 7 December 1939. On 28 July 1944, the First Army Headquarters Defence Company (Royal Montreal Regiment), CASF, landed in France as a unit of First Canadian Army Troops, and it continued to serve in North West Europe until the end of the war. The overseas battalion disbanded on 30 September 1945.

On 24 May 1944, a sub-unit of the regiment, designated as the No. 9 Defence and Employment Platoon (Royal Montreal Regiment), CIC, CASF, was mobilized in England. On 27 June 1944, it landed in France as a unit of First Canadian Army Troops, and it continued to serve in North West Europe until the end of the war. This overseas platoon disbanded on 16 October 1945.

On 1 June 1945, a second Active Force component of the regiment mobilized for service in the Pacific theatre of operations as the 6th Canadian Infantry Division Reconnaissance Troop (The Royal Montreal Regiment), CAC, CASF. It was redesignated the 6th Canadian Infantry 2-2-262 Division Reconnaissance Troop (The Royal Montreal Regiment), RCAC, CASF on 2 August 1945. The
troop disbanded on 1 November 1945.

Afghanistan
The regiment contributed an aggregate of more than 20% of its authorized strength to the various Task Forces which served in Afghanistan between 2002 and 2014.

Alliances 
 - The Yorkshire Regiment (14th/15th, 19th and 33rd/76th Foot)

Battle honours
In the list below, battle honours in small capitals were awarded for participation in large operations and campaigns, while those in lowercase were granted for more specific battles. Those battle honours in bold type are emblazoned on the regimental colour.

Victoria crosses
 Francis Alexander Caron Scrimger
 George Burdon McKean

Badge / Insignia
Argent an autumnal maple leaf proper inscribed ROYAL MONTREAL REGT in letters Or within a belt Azure edged, buckled and inscribed HONI SOIT QUI MAL Y PENSE in letters Or ensigned by the Royal Crown proper and set above a scroll Azure edged and inscribed CANADA in letters Or

The maple leaf and scroll bearing the word “CANADA” represent service to Canada, and the Crown, service to the Sovereign. The belt, with motto, is the insignia of the Most Noble Order of the Garter. “ROYAL MONTREAL REGT” is a form of the regimental title and “HONI SOIT QUI MAL Y PENSE” is the motto of the regiment.

Armoury

The mission of the museum is to collect, preserve, research and photograph material relating to the history of the Royal Montreal Regiment, its former members and its site, and, through the appropriate display of such items, to convey this history to the currently serving members, the broader Canadian Forces community and the public. The museum is affiliated with: CMA, CHIN, OMMC and Virtual Museum of Canada.

Media
 The Royal Montreal Regiment 1925-1945 by R. C. Fetherstonhaugh (1949)
 The Royal Montreal Regiment 14th Battalion C. E. F. 1914-1925 by R. C. Fetherstonhaugh (1927)

See also

 List of armouries in Canada
 Military history of Canada
 History of the Canadian Army
 Canadian Forces
 The Canadian Crown and the Canadian Forces

References

Order of precedence

External links
Regimental website
Regimental Colors
National Defence site website

Infantry regiments of Canada
Westmount, Quebec
Military units and formations of Canada in World War II
Military units and formations established in 1914